Didymella proximella is a species of fungi belonging to the family Didymellaceae. It is known to decompose the dead leaves of Carex capillaris.

References

Fungi described in 1882
Pleosporales